The Black Bottom Historic District is a historic African American community located in Russellville, Kentucky. It is bounded by E. 5th and 7th Sts., Bowling Green Rd. and Morgan St.

Civil rights activist Charles Neblett worked in the neighborhood.

References 

National Register of Historic Places in Logan County, Kentucky
African-American history of Kentucky
Historic districts on the National Register of Historic Places in Kentucky
Neighborhoods in Kentucky
Russellville, Kentucky